Wim Van Eynde (born 24 July 1960) is a Belgian former racing cyclist. He rode in four editions of the Tour de France.

References

External links
 

1960 births
Living people
Belgian male cyclists
Cyclists from Antwerp Province
People from Lier, Belgium